The Teregova mine is a large open pit mine in the western Romania in Caraș-Severin County, 85 km south-east of Reșița and 571 km north-west of the capital, Bucharest. Teregova represents one of the largest feldspar reserves in Romania having estimated reserves of 2,200,000 tonnes of ore.

References 

Feldspar mines in Romania